Jean Félix Demba Telo is a Congolese politician who stood in the March 2002 presidential election as an independent candidate.  He gained 20,252 votes.

References

Living people
Republic of the Congo politicians
Year of birth missing (living people)